Velko Velev (born 4 January 1948) is a Bulgarian athlete. He competed in the men's discus throw at the 1976 Summer Olympics and the 1980 Summer Olympics.

References

External links
 

1948 births
Living people
Athletes (track and field) at the 1976 Summer Olympics
Athletes (track and field) at the 1980 Summer Olympics
Bulgarian male discus throwers
Olympic athletes of Bulgaria
Place of birth missing (living people)